Madabad may refer to:
 Madabad, Hamadan (ماداباد  - Mādābād)
 Madabad, Lorestan (مداباد - Madābād)
 Madabad, Khodabandeh, Zanjan Province (ماداباد  - Mādābād)
 Madabad, Mahneshan, Zanjan Province (ماداباد  - Mādābād)